Pia Elda Locatelli (born 13 August 1949 in Villa d'Almè, Bergamo)
is an Italian politician and
Member of the European Parliament
for North-West
with the Italian Socialist Democrats,
part of the Socialist Group and sits on
the European Parliament's Committee on Industry, Research and Energy
and its Committee on Women's Rights and Gender Equality.

She is a substitute for the Committee on Employment and Social Affairs and a member
of the Delegation for relations with Iran.

From 2008 to 2010 she was the President of the Italian Socialist Party. In the 2013 Italian general election she was elected in the Chamber of Deputies with the Democratic Party, representing the PSI.

Education
 Graduated in languages (1973) and economics (1990)

Career
 1973-1982: Teacher of English language and literature
 1992-2001: Businesswoman
 National coordinator for women (since 1994) and member of the national executive (since 2000) of the SDI
 Vice-Chairman (1992-1999) and then Chairman (since 2004) of the Socialist International Women
 since 2004: Vice-chairman of the Socialist International
 1980-1995: Municipal Councillor
 1990-1995: Leader of the Socialist Group on the Municipal Council of Bergamo
 1990-1995: Member of the board of directors of the University of Bergamo
 since 2000: Chairman of the 'A. J. Zaninoni' Foundation

See also
 2004 European Parliament election in Italy

External links

detailed biography
Her page at the socialist group website

Interventions in Plenary 
 23 February 2005, sul Termine dell'accordo dell'OMC sui tessili e sull'abbigliamento: mms://data.dol.it/dspe/plenariafebbraio2005/locatelli23022005.wmv
 8 March 2005, della quarta Conferenza mondiale sulla piattaforma d'azione per le donne: mms://data.dol.it/dspe/plenariamarzo2005/locatelli08032005.wmv

1949 births
Living people
Italian Democratic Socialists MEPs
MEPs for Italy 2004–2009
21st-century women MEPs for Italy
Italian socialist feminists